Last at Bat was a Meat Loaf concert tour that played 17 dates in Europe during April and May 2013.

The first show was in Newcastle, England on 5 April 2013. The Nottingham performance was cancelled hours before it was due to begin, due to medical conditions affecting several members of the band. The Manchester performance was also cancelled for the same reason; both were rescheduled to 20 and 25 May respectively and made Manchester the final date of the tour.

Tour dates

Set List
 Act one
The first act set includes some of Meat Loaf's greatest hits. The first act set lasts around 50 minutes. The band come on stage to the Beatles' "When I'm Sixty-Four".

 "Runnin' for the Red Light (I Gotta Life)"
 "Life Is a Lemon and I Want My Money Back"
 "Dead Ringer for Love"
 "If It Ain't Broke, Break It"
 "Los Angeloser"
 "The Giving Tree" / "Palome"
 "Objects in the Rear View Mirror May Appear Closer than They Are"
 "Out of the Frying Pan (And into the Fire)"

 Act two
The second act set is the Bat Out of Hell album performed in full and in order.
 "Bat Out of Hell"
 "You Took the Words Right Out of My Mouth"
 "Heaven Can Wait"
 "All Revved Up with No Place to Go"
 "Two Out of Three Ain't Bad"
 "Paradise by the Dashboard Light"
 "For Crying Out Loud"

 Encore
 "I'd Do Anything for Love (But I Won't Do That)" (Abridged version)
 "Boneyard" / "Free Bird" / "All Revved Up With No Place to Go"

Band
 Meat Loaf – lead vocals
 Patti Russo – female lead vocals
 John Miceli – drums
 Paul Crook – guitar
 Randy Flowers – guitar, backing vocals
 Dave Luther – saxophone, keyboards, backing vocals
 Danny Miranda – bass, backing vocals
 Justin Avery – piano, backing vocals

References

Meat Loaf concert tours
2013 concert tours